Arnaud Gaudet (born August 10, 2000) is a Canadian snowboarder who competes internationally in the alpine snowboard discipline.

Career
At the 2020 FIS Snowboarding Junior World Championships, Gaudet won bronze in the parallel giant slalom event.

Gaudet has competed at two Senior World Championships in 2019 and 2021, with his best performance (17th place) coming in 2019 in the parallel slalom event.

During the 2021-22 World Cup Season, Gaudet had a seventh-place finish in January 2022 in the parallel slalom event. Later that month, Gaudet was named to Canada's 2022 Olympic team in the parallel giant slalom event. Gaudet was the youngest ever snowboarder named to Canada's Alpine Olympic snowboard team.

References

External links

2000 births
Living people
Sportspeople from Quebec
Canadian male snowboarders
Snowboarders at the 2022 Winter Olympics
Olympic snowboarders of Canada